Monika Werner (born 10 March 1938) is a German former politician who was a member of the State Council of East Germany, the country's collective head of state, from 1986 until 1990.

Life 

Werner was born in Markranstädt near Leipzig into a working-class family. She worked as an economist and was a manager at VEB Lokomotivbau-Elektrotechnische Werke "Hans Beimler" in Hennigsdorf.

She was a functionary of the Free German Youth, joined the Socialist Unity Party of Germany (SED) in 1958 and the Free German Trade Union Federation in 1960. Werner was also a local SED party executive in Henningsdorf.

Werner was awarded the Patriotic Order of Merit. In 1990 she retired from politics and subsequently worked in the real estate sector.

References 

 
 

1938 births
Living people
People from Markranstädt
Socialist Unity Party of Germany politicians
Free German Youth members
Free German Trade Union Federation members
Members of the State Council of East Germany
Members of the 4th Volkskammer
Members of the 5th Volkskammer
Members of the 6th Volkskammer
Members of the 7th Volkskammer
Members of the 8th Volkskammer
Members of the 9th Volkskammer
Female members of the Volkskammer
Recipients of the Patriotic Order of Merit